Rainbow Gladiator is an album by the American jazz violinist Billy Bang recorded in 1981 and released on the Italian Soul Note label.

Reception
The Allmusic review by Scott Yanow awarded the album 4 stars calling it "a good introduction to his music for those who have an open mind toward adventurous jazz".

Track listing
All compositions by Billy Bang
 "Rainbow Gladiator" - 14:19 
 "Ebony Minstrel Man" - 4:16 
 "New York After Dark" - 7:20 
 "Broken Strings" - 2:44 
 "Yaa - Woman Born on Thursday" - 5:09 
 "Bang's Bounce" - 3:23
Recorded at Barigozzi Studio in Milano, Italy on June 10 & 11, 1981

Personnel
Billy Bang - violin
Charles Tyler - alto saxophone, baritone saxophone
Michele Rosewoman – piano
Wilber Morris – bass
Dennis Charles – drums

References

Black Saint/Soul Note albums
Billy Bang albums
1981 albums